Manning, Maxwell and Moore was a railroad equipment supply manufacturing company that was based in Bridgeport, Connecticut. It was founded by Charles Arthur Moore in 1905.

The company manufactured pressure gauges, valves, cranes, and hoists.

History
They purchased the Bendix Helicopters factory in 1945, located in Stratford, Connecticut.

Dresser Industries acquired Manning, Maxwell and Moore, Inc. in 1964.

See also
Mary Elsie Moore — daughter of Charles Arthur Moore''.

References

Companies based in Bridgeport, Connecticut
American companies established in 1905
Manufacturing companies established in 1905
Manufacturing companies disestablished in 1964
1905 establishments in Connecticut
1964 disestablishments in Connecticut
1964 mergers and acquisitions
Defunct manufacturing companies based in Connecticut